Samakab Hussein (born October 12, 1980) is a Somali-American politician serving in the Minnesota House of Representatives since 2023. A member of the Minnesota Democratic-Farmer-Labor Party (DFL), Hussein represents District 65A in the Twin Cities, which includes parts of the city of Saint Paul in Ramsey County, Minnesota.

Early life, education and career 
Hussein came to the United States from Somalia when he was 14. He received his bachelor's degree in business and accounting from St. Mary's University, and a M.A.P.L. in advocacy and political leadership from Metropolitan State University in 2023.

Minnesota House of Representatives 
Hussein was first elected to the Minnesota House of Representatives in 2022, after redistricting and the retirement of DFL incumbent Rena Moran, who decided to run for Ramsey County Commissioner. Hussein is the vice-chair of the Legacy Finance Committee and sits on the Capital Investment, Housing Finance and Policy, and Labor and Industry Finance and Policy Committees.

Electoral history

Personal life 
Hussein lives in Saint Paul, Minnesota, with his spouse, and has two children.

References

External links 

Members of the Minnesota House of Representatives
American people of Somali descent
Somali American
1980 births
Living people